Washington's 28th legislative district is one of forty-nine districts in Washington state for representation in the state legislature. It is in Pierce County, and contains a bit of Tacoma, and the cities of Fircrest, University Place, Lakewood, Steilacoom, and DuPont. It also contains Ketron Island, Anderson Island, and McNeil Island.

The district's legislators are state senator T'wina Nobles and state representatives Mari Leavitt (position 1) and Dan Bronoske (position 2), all Democrats.

See also
Washington Redistricting Commission
Washington State Legislature
Washington State Senate
Washington House of Representatives

References

External links
Washington State Redistricting Commission
Washington House of Representatives
Map of Legislative Districts

28